Cumulative density function is a self-contradictory phrase resulting from confusion between:

 probability density function, and
 cumulative distribution function.

The two words cumulative and density contradict each other.